This is a list of conflicts in Democratic Republic of the Congo arranged chronologically from the early modern period to present day. This list includes nationwide and international wars, including: wars of independence, liberation wars, colonial wars, undeclared wars, proxy wars, territorial disputes, and world wars. Also listed might be any battle that occurred within the territory of what is today known as the, "Democratic Republic of the Congo" but was itself only part of an operation of a campaign of a theater of a war. There may also be periods of violent civil unrest listed, such as: riots, shootouts, spree killings, massacres, terrorist attacks, and civil wars. The list might also contain episodes of: human sacrifice, mass suicide, massacres, and genocides.

Early modern period

Kingdom of Kongo

1622 Kongo-Portuguese War
1665 — 1709 Kongo Civil War

Late modern period

Congo Free State

1892 — 1894 Congo Arab war
1895 — 1908 Batetela Rebellions

Contemporary history

Republic of the Congo

30 June 1960 — 25 November 1966 Congo Crisis
January 1964 — November 1964  Simba Rebellion
8 November 1960  Niemba Ambush
17 January 1961  Assassination of Patrice Lumumba
September 1961 Siege of Jadotville
11 November 1961 — 12 November 1961  Kindu atrocity
July 1966 Kisangani Mutinies

Republic of Zaire

8 March 1977 — 26 May 1977 Shaba I
11 May 1978 — June 1978  Shaba II
1987 — ongoing Lord's Resistance Army insurgency
24 October 1996 — 16 May 1997  First Congo War

Democratic Republic of the Congo

2 August 1998 — 18 July 2003  Second Congo War
1999 — 2007  Ituri Conflict
24 February 2003 Bogoro massacre
12 June 2003  Operation Artemis
December 2005  Operation North Night Final
2002 — 2003 Effacer le tableau
2004  — 2013  Kivu Conflict
26 October 2008 — 23 March 2009  Nord-Kivu campaign
20 January 2009 — 27 February 2009  Eastern Congo offensive
4 April 2012 — 7 November 2013 M23 rebellion
2007 — ongoing ADF insurgency
2009  Dongo conflict
27 February 2011 Democratic Republic of the Congo coup d'état attempt
30 December 2013 Kinshasa attacks
2020 Congo attacks
2021 Congo attacks

See also

Military of the Democratic Republic of the Congo
Land Forces of the Democratic Republic of the Congo
Air Force of the Democratic Republic of the Congo
Navy of the Democratic Republic of the Congo
Military history of Africa
African military systems up until the year 1800
African military systems between the years 1800 and 1900
African military systems after the year 1900

Military history of the Democratic Republic of the Congo
Conflicts
Conflicts